D.E.B.S. is a 2003 American action comedy short film written and directed by Angela Robinson. D.E.B.S. made the film festival circuit including the Sundance Film Festival, L.A. Outfest and New York Lesbian and Gay Film Festival, receiving a total of seven film festival awards.

D.E.B.S. is both a parody and an emulation of the Charlie's Angels (2000) format. It features a lesbian love story between one of the heroes and the villain.

Plot
A narrator explains that there is a test hidden in the SATs which measures an applicant's ability to fight, cheat, lie and kill. Female students who score well on this hidden test are selected to become members of the secret paramilitary group D.E.B.S. which stands for Discipline, Energy, Beauty and Strength.

Focusing on one squad of D.E.B.S. composed of the team captain Amy, the tough Max, French exchange student Dominique, and the prissy and insecure Janet, all of whom face off against a ruthless villain named Lucinda Reynolds, also known as Lucy in the Sky.

Spoofing television prime time shows, a recap shows the team's boss Mr. Tibbs explaining that Lucy in the Sky was spotted entering the United States again. Max is frustrated knowing that for some reason Lucy keeps capturing Amy and the team has to rescue her. Amy is captured, leading to Max to take over the team to lead them to Lucy's hideout in a dockside warehouse. Max, Janet, and the chain-smoking Dominique make entry into Lucy's hideout and soon are facing off in a gun battle with Lucy's henchmen, led by her right-hand man Billy Skids.

Meanwhile, unknown to either Lucy's henchmen or the D.E.B.S., Lucy and Amy are lovers and Lucy keeps capturing Amy so that the two of them can have sex, with Amy timing them to know when her colleagues will appear to "rescue" her. This time Lucy becomes frustrated over the same routine they have to go through over their secret romance each time. Amy then tells Lucy that she really loves her, and Lucy is happy.

Elsewhere, Max, Janet, and Dominique defeat Lucy's henchmen (with Dominique never dropping the cigarette she's smoking, and Max having an all-too-brief meeting of minds with Skids during their fistfight, while Janet is just determined not to get her favorite sweater ruined). The three D.E.B.S. arrive at a locked door to Lucy's quarters where they hear Amy screaming out, leading them to try to break down the door. But Amy is not screaming in pain, but in passion as she climaxes from the sex. Lucy and Amy quickly dress where Amy tells Lucy that she can capture her again next week during the D.E.B.S. mission to Uganda. On cue from Amy, Lucy punches her out and makes her escape as Max, Janet, and Dominique arrive, none of them aware to Amy's secret tryst with the enemy. Amy thanks them for rescuing her—again. The four D.E.B.S. walk out of the warehouse and into the sunset as Janet asks Amy if that is her sweater that she's wearing and if she got blood or any dirt on it.

Cast
 Alexandra Breckenridge as Amy
 Tammy Lynn Michaels as Max
 Shanti Lowry as Dominique 
 Jill Ritchie as Janet
 Clare Kramer as Lucy Diamond
 Daryl Theirse as Mr. Tibbs
 James Buckhammer II as Billy Skids

Significance
The move from a short film to a feature-length film for this lesbian-themed film is significant not only because of the theme but because several of the persons involved in this short are lesbians (director Angela Robinson, Tammy Lynn Michaels) and the short was sponsored by a grant from POWER UP, which promotes gay women in entertainment.

When moving from the short to the feature film version, Robinson told AfterEllen.com that "The relationship between Amy and Lucy is still the heart of the movie... Screen Gems has been outrageously supportive. I was not pressured to tone down the relationship — if anything, we worked together... to make the relationship more complex and intimate". Robinson's interview allayed concerns that the lesbian relationship would be written out or downplayed on the Hollywood big screen as it has in other story-based movies such as Fried Green Tomatoes.

Awards

References

External links
 

2003 films
2003 short films
2003 action comedy films
2000s high school films
2003 independent films
2000s parody films
2000s teen comedy films
American action comedy films
American high school films
American independent films
American parody films
American spy comedy films
American teen comedy films
American teen LGBT-related films
American comedy short films
Films directed by Angela Robinson
Films produced by Andrea Sperling
Girls with guns films
Lesbian-related films
LGBT-related comedy films
American LGBT-related short films
2000s spy comedy films
2003 LGBT-related films
2003 comedy films
2000s English-language films
2000s American films